No Right Turn is an independently produced erotic thriller film from Denmark directed by David Noel Bourke. It stars Laura Bach, Sira Stampe, Tao Hildebrand and Lars Lippert.

It officially premiered at Denmark's prestigious CPH:PIX  Film Festival in 2009 where it showcased in the new Danish talent category.

California based company Lono Entertainment, officially released the DVD in North America and Canada. 
It has also been released in Denmark via Another World Entertainment 
 and in Sweden via Njuta Films.

Movie Plot
Nina is the voluptuously alluring girlfriend of Johnny, a charming but delusional crook. To escape from her life with Johnny she casually sleeps with an old friend, Teddy. One night after an argument with Johnny, she storms home where she is abducted by a pair of thugs but is rescued by a beautiful and timid girl, Monella. Together Nina and Monella begin an erotic and passionate relationship that leads to a plot to steal Johnny's drug stash hidden in a safety deposit box. But nothing goes as planned and the two beautiful women get caught up in a lethally twisted tale of revenge and betrayal that send all four characters to their dark destiny.

Background and themes
After No Right Turn officially premiered at the CPH:PIX film festival 2009.

The Danish newspaper Berlingske Tidende described it as a breath of fresh air in the Danish film industry.

International reviews were also positive, with UK's critic MJ Simpson 
stating it is A clever, tightly honed script combines with assured direction and a central quartet of excellent performances make No Right Turn a real joy to watch.

The film was produced with a small cast and crew. No Right Turn is a character-based dreamy movie blending film noir, pulp, crime and fantasy.

References

External links
 Official Site
 

2000s thriller drama films
Neo-noir
2000s erotic thriller films
Danish thriller drama films
Danish erotic drama films